After Hours or Afterhours may refer to:

Film and television 
 After Hours (film), a 1985 black comedy by Martin Scorsese
 After Hours (Canadian TV series), a 1953 variety series
 After Hours (1958 British TV series), a comedy sketch show
 After Hours (Singaporean TV series), a 2007 drama series
 After Hours (2015 British TV series), a comedy-drama series
 Cracked After Hours, a 2010 web series

Episodes 
 "After Hours" (Dawson's Creek)
 "After Hours" (House)
 "After Hours" (The Office) (U.S.)
 "After Hours" (Ugly Betty)
 "The After Hours", an episode of the original The Twilight Zone
 "The After Hours" (The Twilight Zone, 1985), a remade version for the 1980s revival

Music 
 Afterhour (band), an American rock band
 Afterhours (band), an Italian rock band
 After Hours, the 2018 Barbershop Harmony Society champion quartet
 After Hours (radio show), a 1993–2007 Canadian jazz program

Albums 
 After Hours (André Previn album), 1989
 After Hours (Gary Moore album), 1992
 After Hours (Glenn Frey album) or the title song, 2012
 After Hours (Hank Crawford album), 1966
 After Hours (Jay McShann album), 1982
 After Hours (Jeanne Lee and Mal Waldron album), 1994
 After Hours (John Pizzarelli album), 1996
 After Hours (Little River Band album), 1976
 After Hours (Pinetop Perkins album), 1988
 After Hours (Rahsaan Patterson album) or the title song, 2004
 After Hours (Richard Holmes album), 1962
 After Hours (1955 Sarah Vaughan album) or the title song
 After Hours (1961 Sarah Vaughan album)
 After Hours (Thad Jones album), 1957
 After Hours (Timeflies album), 2014
 After Hours (The Weeknd album) or the title song (see below), 2020
 After Hours (EP), by Glamour of the Kill, 2014
 After Hours: Forward to Scotland's Past or the title song, by the Battlefield Band, 1987
 After Hours: Unplugged & Rewired, by Digital Summer, 2013
  After Hours with Joe Bushkin, 1951
 After Hours with Miss "D", by Dinah Washington, 1954
 After Hours, featuring Charlie Christian
 After Hours, by Linda Perry, 1999
 After Hours (Live in Paris), by The Bothy Band, 1979
 After Hours, by Mae Muller, 2019
 AfterHours (album), by Mack Wilds, 2017

Songs 
 "After Hours" (Avery Parrish song), 1940; covered by many performers
 "After Hours" (The Velvet Underground song), 1969
 "After Hours" (We Are Scientists song), 2008
 "After Hours" (The Weeknd song), 2020
 "After Hours", by Adam Lambert from The Original High, 2015
 "After Hours", by The Crystal Method from The Crystal Method, 2014
 "After Hours", by Electric Six from Zodiac, 2010
 "After Hours", by Living Legends from The Gathering, 2008
 "Afterhours", by deadmau5 from At Play, 2008
 "Afterhours", by Hurricane #1 from Only the Strongest Will Survive, 1999
 "Afterhours", by Nina Nesbitt, 2019

Other uses 
 Afterhour club, an underground rave-like club
 After Hours Formalwear, now known as MW Tux, a chain of stores selling formal wear
 After-hours trading or extended hours trading, the trading of securities after the stock market has closed
 After Hours (novel), a 1979 novel by Edwin Torres